Hidden Island is located in the middle of Lake Wakatipu in New Zealand and is very close to Cecil Peak. Its name is because from many parts of Queenstown the island is invisible.

A local kayak company has a trip that takes you to the island from Queenstown.
In 2010 two kayakers died near Hidden Island.

See also

 Desert island
 List of islands

References

Uninhabited islands of New Zealand
Islands of Otago
Lake islands of New Zealand